Dandeson Coates Crowther  (24 September 1844–1938) was Archdeacon of The Niger from 1876 until 1926.

The son of Ajayi Crowther, Bishop on the Niger, and the first African Anglican bishop in Nigeria he was educated at the CMS College, Islington. He was in the foundation class of CMS Grammar School, Lagos in 1860.  He was ordained deacon at St Mary's Church, Islington on 10 June 1870; and priest on 12 March 1871. He was at Bonny until his appointment as Archdeacon.

References

1845 births
1938 deaths
Archdeacons of the Niger
CMS Grammar School, Lagos alumni
Alumni of the Church Missionary Society College, Islington
Officers of the Order of the British Empire
Yoruba Christian clergy
Abiodun family
19th-century Nigerian Anglican priests
20th-century Nigerian Anglican priests
People from colonial Nigeria